Vaglen is a village in Aksakovo Municipality, in Varna Province, in North-Eastern Bulgaria. Most inhabitants are Vlachs.

Honours
Vaglen Point on Clarence Island, Antarctica is named after the village.

References

Villages in Varna Province